Kütahya is an electoral district of the Grand National Assembly of Turkey. It elects five members of parliament (deputies) to represent the province of the same name for a four-year term by the D'Hondt method, a party-list proportional representation system.

Members 
Population reviews of each electoral district are conducted before each general election, which can lead to certain districts being granted a smaller or greater number of parliamentary seats. At the last election Kütahya's seat allocation fell to five, having been at six since 1995.

General elections

2011 

Presidential elections

2014

References 

Electoral districts of Turkey
Politics of Kütahya Province